In Greek mythology, Pheidas (Ancient Greek: Φείδας means 'sparing, thrifty') was an Athenian who participated in the Trojan War. During the battle, he supported their leader Menestheus against the Trojan hero Hector.

See also 
  for Jovian asteroid 23135 Pheidas

Notes

References 

 Homer, The Iliad with an English Translation by A.T. Murray, Ph.D. in two volumes. Cambridge, MA., Harvard University Press; London, William Heinemann, Ltd. 1924. . Online version at the Perseus Digital Library.
 Homer, Homeri Opera in five volumes. Oxford, Oxford University Press. 1920. . Greek text available at the Perseus Digital Library.

Achaeans (Homer)